Mikhail Gorelik (born 21 March 1958) is a Soviet former swimmer who competed in the 1976 Summer Olympics and in the 1980 Summer Olympics.

References

1958 births
Living people
Russian male butterfly swimmers
Russian male medley swimmers
Olympic swimmers of the Soviet Union
Swimmers at the 1976 Summer Olympics
Swimmers at the 1980 Summer Olympics
Universiade medalists in swimming
Universiade gold medalists for the Soviet Union
Medalists at the 1979 Summer Universiade
Soviet male swimmers
Swimmers from Saint Petersburg